Andreana Kostantina Tantaros (born December 30, 1978) is an American conservative political analyst and commentator. She was a co-host of Outnumbered on Fox News, and an original co-host of The Five.  She sued Fox News in August 2016, accusing Roger Ailes, Bill O'Reilly, and others of sexual harassment. The case was dismissed in court in May 2018.

Early life and education
Tantaros was born December 30, 1978, in Allentown, Pennsylvania, where she attended and graduated from Parkland High School in South Whitehall Township, Pennsylvania. Her father is a Greek immigrant, and her mother is of Italian descent. Her family owned the Pied Piper Diner, where she worked.

She graduated from Lehigh University with a degree in French and journalism, being fluent also in Greek and Spanish. As she was finishing her degree, she worked as an intern for CNN's Crossfire program, when she helped cover the Republican National Convention in Philadelphia. Her journal notes during the experience depict her advising herself to "Make yourself invaluable. Ask questions... Be a jack of all trades." She completed her graduate studies at University of Paris, where she earned a master's degree. After returning from Paris in 2003, Tantaros moved to Washington, D.C.

Career
Tantaros worked as a spokeswoman for Massachusetts Governor William Weld, then Congressman Pat Toomey and former National Republican Congressional Committee Chairman Thomas Reynolds. After moving to New York City in 2005, she started Andrea Tantaros Media, which provided crisis management and media strategy consulting to Fortune 500 companies and political campaigns.

Tantaros joined Fox News in April 2010 as a political contributor. In 2011, she was named a co-host of The Five. After several months of airing, The Five consistently beat its competitors on MSNBC and CNN combined. By 2013, it was the second-most watched program in cable news.

Tantaros went on to co-host Outnumbered in 2014. In December 2014, in response to a Senate Intelligence Committee report on CIA torture programs, Tantaros said, "The United States of America is awesome. We are awesome, but we've had this discussion" about torture." "The reason they want to have this discussion is not to show how awesome we are...this administration wants to have this discussion to show us how we're not awesome." This is because "they apologized for this country, they don't like this country, they want us to look bad. And all this does is have our enemies laughing at us, that we are having this debate again."

Sexual harassment complaints against Fox News
After initiating formal complaints of sexual harassment against Fox News personnel, on April 25, 2016, she was pulled from the show for what Fox News said were "contract issues." In August 2016, Tantaros filed a lawsuit claiming that she approached Fox News executives about Roger Ailes sexually harassing her in 2015. She said that her allegations resulted first in her being demoted from The Five to Outnumbered, and then in her being taken off the air in April 2016. The lawsuit also claimed that Bill O'Reilly, Dean Cain, and Scott Brown made inappropriate comments to her, and that Brown and Cain touched her without her consent. Brown, Cain, and O'Reilly all denied her allegations.  Her amended complaint, filed on January 29, 2018, contained details intended to back up her claims of a culture of harassment—including spying on employees—at the network. However, that complaint, too, was rejected. On May 18, 2018, Judge George B. Daniels threw her case out, citing lack of "factual support." Tantaros, with no formal legal training, had decided to represent herself in the case after going through three lawyers.

Books
In 2016, she authored Tied Up in Knots: How Getting What We Wanted Made Women Miserable, published by Broadside Books.

Tantaros' editor Michael Malice sued her (under his original name Michael Krechmer) in October 2016, claiming that he was the ghostwriter of the book, and Tantaros did not pay him the full amount they agreed to. In response, Tantaros insisted that she wrote the book herself, and her attorney at the time indicated his opinion that "We have good reason to believe Fox News is behind this case." Tantaros also said that Malice fed information about her (and the book) to Fox News in violation of her confidentiality agreement with him as her editor. The lawsuit was dismissed. Malice appealed the dismissal and lost.

References

External links

1978 births
Living people
21st-century American journalists
21st-century American women writers
American columnists
American political commentators
American political writers
American women columnists
American women non-fiction writers
American writers of Greek descent
American writers of Italian descent
Fox News people
Journalists from Pennsylvania
Lehigh University alumni
Conservatism in the United States
Parkland High School (Pennsylvania) alumni
Pennsylvania Republicans
University of Paris alumni

Writers from Allentown, Pennsylvania